The 2022 Pan Jiu-Jitsu Championship was an international jiu-jitsu event, organised by the International Brazilian Jiu-Jitsu Federation (IBJFF), held at the Silver Spurs Arena in Kissimmee, Florida, from 6-10 April 2022.

History
The Pan Jiu-Jitsu Championship is considered the second most important tournament after the world championship on the IBJJF calendar.

Medal overview

Men 
Adult male black belt results

Women 
Adult female black belt results

Teams results 
Results by Academy

See also 
Pan Jiu-Jitsu Championship
World Jiu-Jitsu Championship
European IBJJF Jiu-Jitsu Championship

References 

Sports competitions in Florida
International sports competitions hosted by the United States
Pan Jiu-Jitsu Championship
Pan Jiu-Jitsu Championship
Brazilian jiu-jitsu competitions in the United States
Pan Jiu-Jitsu Championship